Undrið FF is a Faroese football team from the Faroese capital Tórshavn. The team also plays at the Hoyvíkvøllur. The club was founded 18 January 2006, under the name Undrið FF. This makes the team one of the youngest member of the Faroe Islands Football Association.

History

The idea to found the new football team began with a birthday party in 2005.

In the 2021 season, the team cruise-controlled through the season, gaining promotion to the 1. Deild for the first time in the club's history. This was the first season that chairman, Arnar Lognberg, was in charge of the team for a full calendar year.

Name
The team is named after its first team sponsor, the Faroese representative of the Icelandic soap producer Undri, which means wonder in Icelandic. It means the same in the Faroese language, however a definite article is added making it Undrið, but the Faroese pronunciation remains the same. (In Icelandic, they would be different).

Honours
2. deild: 1
2021 (Manager Arnar Lognberg)

3. deild: 1
2017 (Manager Arnar Lognberg)

Current squad

Team records
Biggest win: Undri FF – Víkingur 3. deild 16–1
Biggest defeat: ÍF – Undri FF 11–1
Most goals: Sjúrður Jensen
Most matches: Mikkjal Christiansen
Most goals in one match: Christian V. Jacobsen, 6 goals
Longest Clean Sheet: Terji Brynarsson
Most times captain: Mikkjal Christiansen

References

External links
Official website 
Profile at Fótbólssamband Føroya 

Undri FF
Association football clubs established in 2006
2006 establishments in the Faroe Islands